Skylark is a live album by the Shirley Scott Trio recorded in 1991 at Birdland and released on the Candid label.

Reception
The Allmusic site awarded the album 4 stars.

Track listing 
 "Skylark" (Hoagy Carmichael, Johnny Mercer) - 8:21    
 "I Still Want You/You Are My Heart's Delight"  (Timothy Carpenter/, Franz Lehár, Fritz Löhner-Beda) - 9:07    
 "All the Things You Are" (Oscar Hammerstein II, Jerome Kern) - 8:45    
 "Alone Together" (Howard Dietz, Arthur Schwartz) - 10:56    
 "Peace" (Horace Silver) - 7:25    
 "McGhee and Me" (Shirley Scott) - 8:54    
 "The Party's Over/The Theme" (Betty Comden, Adolph Green, Jule Styne/Miles Davis) - 6:23

Personnel 
 Shirley Scott - piano
 Arthur Harper - bass 
 Mickey Roker - drums

References 

1991 live albums
Candid Records live albums
Shirley Scott live albums